Aleksei Yevgenyevich Gasilin (born 1 March 1996) is a Russian professional footballer who plays as a striker for FC Amkal Moscow.

Club career
He made his debut in the Russian Premier League on 26 May 2013 for FC Zenit St. Petersburg in a game against FC Amkar Perm.

On 24 February 2017, he signed a 3.5-year contract with FC Amkar Perm.

Following the bankruptcy of Amkar, he signed with the Portuguese club Académico de Viseu on 2 July 2018.

On 8 February 2019, he signed a 1.5-year contract with FC Tom Tomsk.

On 29 August 2019, he returned to FC Zenit-2 Saint Petersburg on loan.

On 5 June 2020, he signed with FC Volgar Astrakhan.

Gasilin announced his retirement from professional football on 27 February 2022. He then joined FC Amkal Moscow on amateur levels.

International
He won the 2013 UEFA European Under-17 Football Championship with Russia, scoring a penalty shoot-out goal in the semi-final. He also participated in the 2013 FIFA U-17 World Cup.

Later he represented Russia national under-19 football team at the 2015 UEFA European Under-19 Championship, where Russia came in second.

Career statistics

Club

References

External links
 

1996 births
Living people
Footballers from Saint Petersburg
Russian footballers
Association football forwards
Russian expatriate footballers
Russia youth international footballers
Russia under-21 international footballers
FC Zenit Saint Petersburg players
FC Schalke 04 II players
Expatriate footballers in Germany
FC Amkar Perm players
Académico de Viseu F.C. players
FC Tom Tomsk players
FC Volgar Astrakhan players
Ermis Aradippou FC players
Russian Premier League players
Liga Portugal 2 players
Expatriate footballers in Portugal
Expatriate footballers in Cyprus
FC Leningradets Leningrad Oblast players
FC Zenit-2 Saint Petersburg players